Archbishop Bergan High School is a private, Roman Catholic high school in Fremont, Nebraska, United States.  It is located in the Roman Catholic Archdiocese of Omaha.

Background
Archbishop Bergan High School was established in 1950 as St. Patrick's High School. When the school relocated to its current location in 1960, it was renamed after Gerald Thomas Bergan, archbishop of the Omaha diocese from 1948 to 1969.

In 2010, a new building was constructed for the grade school, with Pre-K-6th grade at the new building, and 7-12th grades at the high school building.

Activities
Archbishop Bergan is a member of the Nebraska School Activities Association and the Centennial Conference.  The school has  won the following NSAA State Championships:

 Boys' football - Champion: 1979-1980
 Boys' basketball - Champion: 1979-1980, 1986–1987, 2007–2008, 2013-2014
 Boys' golf - Champion: 2009
 Girls' volleyball - Champion: 2018
 Girls' basketball - Champion: 2018-2019

Notable alumni
 Zach Wiegert, former football player in the NFL

External links 
 School website

References

Catholic secondary schools in Nebraska
Fremont, Nebraska
Educational institutions established in 1950
Roman Catholic Archdiocese of Omaha
Schools in Dodge County, Nebraska
1950 establishments in Nebraska